13 Commandments is a 2017 Dutch-language (Flemish) television series starring Dirk van Dijck, Marie Vinck and Karlijn Sileghem. The plot revolves around Peter Devriendt (Dirk van Dijck), a divorced father and veteran cop working for Belgium’s Federal Criminal Police, and his new partner Vicky Degraeve (Marie Vinck). A serial killer begins a crime spree with the mission to punish individuals who have committed acts that counter the Ten Commandments.

Plot
The body of a 16-year old Turkish teenage girl is found in the town of Aalst, her throat cut. The police assume it to be an honour killing committed by her uncle but are stymied by the family's refusal to testify. Within a day, the suspect himself is found under a bridge, badly burned but alive. On the bridge above him, someone has sprayed the words "Thou shalt have no other gods", referencing the first commandment.

This is the first in a series of crimes, committed by someone going by the name of Moses, each of which is in some way inspired by one of the Ten Commandments. Those who have been perceived to have violated the Commandments are hunted down and punished without mercy. 
Two police detectives, Vicky Degraeve (Marie Vinck) and Peter Devriendt (Dirk Van Dijck) are assigned to find the vigilante but are increasingly hindered by the public opinion, which supports Moses despite his excesses.

Cast
 Dirk van Dijck as Peter Devriendt
 Marie Vinck as Vicky Degraeve
 Karlijn Sileghem as Liesbet Dujardin
 Line Pillet as Sara Devriendt
 Hans De Munterv as Georges Degraeve
 Lola Rose Delany as Blue
 Ella Leyers as Paulien Rooze
 Katelijne Verbeke as Chantal Theunissen
 Kim Hertogs as Kelly
 Karen van Parijs as Vicky's Mother
 Leo Achten as Peter's Father
 Gökhan Girginol as Hristo Bodurov
 Jeroen Perceval as Felix Monnet
 Bert Haelvoet as Simon Roelandts
 Koen van Impe as Tony Vermeire
 Ludo Hoogmartens as Jos Schatteman
 Joke Sluydts as Journaliste
 Tom Ternest as Marnix Santermans
 Hilde De Baerdemaeker as Sofie Vandekerckhoven
 Roy Aernouts as Mike De Meyer
 Maarten Mertens as Journalist
 Matthieu Sys as Lukas Heyde

Release
13 Commandments was released on September 10, 2018 on VTM.

References

External links
 

2017 Belgian television series debuts
Flemish television shows
2010s crime television series
Television shows set in Belgium
Dutch-language television shows
VTM (TV channel) original programming